Osório Pereira (March 1905 – 27 December 1991) was a Brazilian rower. He competed in two events at the 1932 Summer Olympics.

References

1905 births
1991 deaths
Brazilian male rowers
Olympic rowers of Brazil
Rowers at the 1932 Summer Olympics
Place of birth missing